Seven Hickories is an unincorporated community in Kent County, Delaware, United States. Seven Hickories is at the intersection of Delaware Route 15 and Delaware Route 42, west of Cheswold and east of Kenton.

References

Unincorporated communities in Kent County, Delaware
Unincorporated communities in Delaware